Jean de Boishue (born 1943) is a French aristocrat, politician and author.

Early life
Jean de Boishue was born on September 12, 1943 in Boulogne-Billancourt near Paris.

Career
He joined the Rally for the Republic, a defunct center-right political party. He served as the Mayor of Brétigny-sur-Orge from 1984 to 2001. He served as a member of the National Assembly from March 28, 1993 to April 21, 1997, representing Essonne.

Bibliography
Banlieue mon amour (Paris: Éditions de la Table ronde, 1995).
Anti-Secrets (Paris: Editions Plon, 2015).

References

1943 births
Living people
People from Boulogne-Billancourt
Politicians from Île-de-France
Rally for the Republic politicians
Deputies of the 10th National Assembly of the French Fifth Republic
French political writers